The Viva Puerto Rico Tour was a tour performed by Puerto Rican recording artist Ivy Queen. In association with Score, Grande Entertainment, and Club Papi, the tour launched on January 28, 2014.

The tour will include performances at various gay clubs in cities of the United States, such as New York, Orlando, Miami, Houston, Seattle, San Francisco, San Diego, Atlanta, Sacramento, and Los Angeles. Performances in Boston and Tampa have also been confirmed as well. A performance in Puerto Rico was not planned, however due to the tour's success, a performance in Ponce was announced. The tour also caused Ivy Queen's eighth studio album Musa (2012) to reenter the Billboard Latin Albums chart at number thirty-six for the week of February 9, 2014.

Background
In 2008, Ivy Queen received an award from GLAAD for her support of the gay community. Ivy Queen headlined the Machete Music Tour 2010, which performed in cities such as New York and Los Angeles and featured "the hottest stars in reggaeton and Latin urban music", including Chino & Nacho, Flex, Jowell & Randy, Tego Calderon, Don Omar, Cosculluela, Angel & Khriz, J-King & Maximan and R.K.M & Ken-Y.

After the success of Queen's eighth studio album Musa which was nominated for Best Urban Music Album at the Latin Grammy Awards of 2013, it was announced in September 2013, that Queen had changed management and returned with Jorge "Goguito" Guadalupe, president and co-founder of Filtro Musik, to release her ninth studio album in February 2014. Following the birth of her first child, Queen then announced that she would embark on a U.S. tour entitled the "Viva Puerto Rico Tour".

Setlist
"12 Discípulos"
"Cuando Las Mujeres"
"Cupido"
"Dime"
"Dime Sí Recuerdas"
"Jala Gatilo"
"La Vida Es Así"
"Menor Que Yo"
"Muchos Quieren Tumbarme"
"Never Leave You (Uh Oooh, Uh Oooh)"
"Noche De Entierro (Nuestro Amor)"
"Papi Te Quiero"
"Peligro De Extinción"
"Pobre Diabla"
"Reggae Respect"
"Sí Una Vez"
"The Next Episode"
"Te He Querido, Te He Llorado"
"Que Lloren"
"Quiero Bailar"
"Quiero Saber"

Synopsis
Tickets for the January 28 event were between $15 and $55. The age suitability was 21 and up, with the event beginning at nine at night. It was held at Score Nightclub in Miami, Florida. The next event, the January 30 event, was held at the Parliament House Nightclub. The doors were open from eight at night until three in the morning, however the concert did not begin until one in the morning.

Each event included a "VIP Meet and Greet Package. If you purchased the "VIP Meet and Great Package", then you received express entry into event, exclusive Meet and Greet with Queen, one free Ivy Queen CD, one personalized autograph, one picture taken with Queen and a complimentary Live at Club Papi CD.

Tour dates

Cancellations and rescheduled shows

Press conferences

References

2014 concert tours
Ivy Queen concert tours